SimpleXML is a PHP extension that allows users to easily manipulate/use XML data. It was introduced in PHP 5 as an object oriented approach to the XML DOM providing an object that can be processed with normal property selectors and array iterators. It represents an easy way of getting an element's attributes and textual content if you know the XML document's structure or layout.

Compared to DOM or the Expat parser, SimpleXML takes a fewer lines of code to read text data from an element.

Functions 

 addAttribute()
 addChild()
 asXML()
 attributes()
 children()
 __construct()
 getDocNamespaces()
 getName()
 getNamespaces()
 registerXPathNamespace()
 xpath()
 simplexml_import_dom
 simplexml_load_file
 simplexml_load_string

Error handling 
It is possible to suppress all XML errors when loading the document and then iterate over the errors.

References

External links 
 PHP.net's SimpleXML manual
 AIP Conf. Proc. 1497, pp. 395-401; Speed up of XML parsers with PHP language implementation
 devshed SimpleXML Tutorial

PHP software
XML parsers